Jalan Sultan Yahya Petra (formerly Jalan Semarak/Jalan Henry Gurney) is a major road in Kuala Lumpur, Malaysia. It was named after the sixth Yang di-Pertuan Agong, Sultan Yahya Petra of Kelantan) (1975–1979)

History
On 26 November 2014, the Kuala Lumpur City Hall (DBKL) changed the name of Jalan Semarak to Jalan Sultan Yahya Petra.

List of junctions

Roads in Kuala Lumpur